The 1963 Small Club World Cup was the seventh edition of the Small Club World Cup, a tournament held in Venezuela between 1952 and 1957, and in 1963 and in 1965. It was played by three participants in double round robin format, and featured players like Evaristo, Hilderaldo Bellini, Cecilio Martinez, Custódio Pinto, Francisco Gento and Ferenc Puskás.

Controversies

Di Stefano kidnapping

On the night of 24 August 1963, the Venezuelan revolutionary group Armed Forces of National Liberation (FALN), kidnapped the player Alfredo Di Stéfano (Real Madrid) at gunpoint from the Potomac Hotel, located in Caracas. The kidnapping received the codenamed "Julián Grimau", after the Spanish communist Julián Grimau García, was executed by firing squad in Spain, in April 1963, during Francisco Franco's dictatorship. At 27 August, three days later, Di Stéfano was released unharmed close to the Spanish embassy without a ransom being paid, and Di Stéfano stressed that his kidnappers had not mistreated him. Di Stéfano played in a match against São Paulo the day after he was released and received a standing ovation.

A Spanish movie entitled Real, La Película (Real, The Movie), which recounted these events, was released on 25 August 2005. In a bizarre publicity stunt at the premiere, kidnapper Paul del Rio, now a famous artist, and Di Stéfano were brought together for the first time since the abduction, 42 years before. Paul del Rio died on Caracas at the age of 72.

Bursts of gunfire during Sao Paulo vs Real Madrid

During the interval of August 28 match between São Paulo and Real Madrid, terrified fans invaded the pitch, after the Caracas police shot at protesters pro-FALN outside the stadium. Smoke bombs were used to disperse the public, one of them almost hitting defender De Sordi (São Paulo). The start of the second half was delayed by about 30 minutes.

Participants

Matches 

The final match not played as São Paulo had secured the title due to the head-to-head results with Real Madrid

Final standings

Topscorers 

1 goal

  Evaristo
  Nondas
  Pagão 
  Lucien Muller
  Cecilio Martinez
  Custódio Pinto
  Hernâni 
  Joaquim Jorge
  Amancio
  Félix Ruiz 
  Francisco Gento

Own goal

  Pachín

Champion

References

1963
1963 in South American football
1963 in Brazilian football
1963–64 in Portuguese football
1963–64 in Spanish football
1963 in Venezuelan sport